M-Day is a book by Viktor Suvorov about Soviet Army preparations for the invasion of Germany. The author argues that the Soviet Army was preparing to attack the Germans when Adolf Hitler forestalled Joseph Stalin on 22 June 1941.

M-Day is a sequel to another book written by Suvorov entitled Icebreaker.

See also
M-Day (military designation)

History books about World War II
Eastern Front (World War II)